Sugarless is a song by Swami.

Sugarless may also refer to:
 Sugarless (manga)
 Sugarless (film)
 Sugarless Girl, a 2007 album by Capsule